This is the results breakdown of the local elections held in Asturias on 26 May 2019. The following tables show detailed results in the autonomous community's most populous municipalities, sorted alphabetically.

Opinion polls

Overall

City control
The following table lists party control in the most populous municipalities, including provincial capitals (shown in bold). Gains for a party are displayed with the cell's background shaded in that party's colour.

Municipalities

Avilés
Population: 78,715

Gijón
Population: 271,843

Langreo
Population: 39,984

Mieres
Population: 38,428

Oviedo
Population: 220,020

San Martín del Rey Aurelio
Population: 16,283

Siero
Population: 51,662

See also
2019 Asturian regional election

References

Asturias
2019